Lynwood Gill (19 November 1891 – 4 December 1986) was an Australian cricketer who was a batsman and was praised for having a "fine range of shots" and having a style which was able to popularize the game. He played three first-class matches for Tasmania between 1911 and 1913 and seven matches for Queensland between 1926 and 1928.

Cricket career
Gill played for South Brisbane in district cricket during his playing career, serving as their captain, and he was made a life member of the club in 1927. He worked in cricket administration after his playing career and was Treasurer of the Queensland Cricket Association as of 1937.

See also
 List of Tasmanian representative cricketers

References

External links
 

1891 births
1986 deaths
Australian cricketers
Queensland cricketers
Tasmania cricketers
Cricketers from Tasmania